ASME (American Society of Mechanical Engineers) is a non-profit organization that continues to develop and maintains nearly 600 codes and standards in a wide range of disciplines. Some of which includes the Boiler and Pressure Vessel Code (BPVC), Elevators and Escalators (A17 Series), Piping and Pipelines (B31 Series), Bioprocessing Equipment (BPE), Nuclear Facility Applications (NQA), Process Performance Test Codes (PTC), and Valves, Flanges, Fittings and Gaskets (B16).

The ASME B16 Standardization of Valves Flanges, Fittings and Gaskets Committee, which operates under ASME’s Board on Pressure Technology Codes and Standards is responsible for standards covering valves, flanges, pipe fittings, gaskets and valve actuators for use in pressure services. The B16 Standards Committee currently meets once a year in various locations throughout the United States. The meeting is generally held in March and is open to the general public.

ASME B16 Technical Subcommittees
Membership on the B16 Standards Committee  and its Subordinate groups include a variety of representations from the field in various interest classifications. These interest classifications are; Manufacturer, Distributor, Material Manufacturer, Consumer/User, Designer/Constructor, Regulatory, Insurance/Inspection and General Interest. The B16 Technical Subcommittees under the B16 Standards Committee review and maintain the ASME B16 Standards within their respective scopes.

References

Standards of the United States
American Society of Mechanical Engineers